A mobility kill (or M-kill) in armoured warfare is a weapon or vehicle that is immobilized, or the act of immobilizing such a target. This is often caused by the vehicle triggering an anti-tank mine by driving over it, though it may also result from being hit by a rocket propelled grenade or anti-tank missile.

Tanks and other armoured fighting vehicles can be immobilized by damage to their engines, tracks, or running gear. Because of the mobile nature of modern warfare, such a vehicle is often effectively useless on the battlefield, though it may later be salvaged for spares, or repaired and brought back into action. In rare cases, tanks that have suffered mobility kills have continued to engage enemy targets with their main gun, even though they are immobile. However, in an active battlefield situation any armoured fighting vehicles which have suffered mobility kills are stationary targets for ground-attack planes armed with ordnance such as rockets or cluster bombs. Alternatively they may be subject to artillery bombardment. In any case, enemy ground troops may attack stranded vehicles with additional ATGMs or RPGs.

See also 
 Firepower kill
 Mission kill
 Catastrophic kill (K-Kill)

Notes

References 
 US Army FM 20-32 glossary of terms at globalsecurity.org
 ace and electronic warfare lexicon glossary

Armoured warfare
Military terminology